The Glavița is a left tributary of the river Bega in Romania. It discharges into the Bega near Chizătău. Its lower course is part of the Coșteiu-Chizătău Canal between the Timiș and the Bega.

References

Rivers of Romania
Rivers of Timiș County